This article is a list of notable fires.

Town and city fires

Building or structure fires

Transportation fires

Mining (including oil and natural gas drilling) fires

This is a partial list of fire due to mining: man-made structures to extract minerals, ores, rock, petroleum, natural gas, etc.

Forest and countryside fires

 1933Griffith Park Fire in Los Angeles, California, killed 29 firefighters on October 3
 1933Tillamook Burn, Oregon
 1936Kursha-2, 1200 killed
 1936Bandon, Oregon, Bandon's entire commercial district was destroyed, total loss stated at the time was US$3 million, with 11 fatalities. 
 1937Blackwater fire of 1937 in Shoshone National Forest in Wyoming, killed 15 firefighters on August 21
 1939Black Friday bushfires in Australia. 71 people killed.
 1949 The great forest fire of 1949 in the Landes Forest, wildfire,  lost, 82 people killed.
 1949Mann Gulch fire
 1953Rattlesnake Fire, set by an arsonist named Stan Pattan, in Mendocino National Forest near Willows, California, killed 15 firefighters on July 9
 1963Paraná forest fire, 20,000 square kilometres destroyed, killing at least 110, with 5,000 houses burned in September.
 1966Serra de Sintra forest fire, outskirt of Lisbon, Portugal,  destroyed, killing 26.
 19671967 Tasmanian fires in Tasmania, Australia, 62 killed and over 900 injured.
 1971Kure forest fire, Kure, western Honshū, Japan, 18 firefighters killed on April 27
 1975Fire on the Lüneburg Heath in north Germany, 80 square kilometres destroyed, 7 fatalities including 5 firefighters killed on August 10
 1983Ash Wednesday bushfires killed 75 people and injured more than 2600 others in South Australia and Victoria.
 19871987 Daxing'anling wildfire in People's Republic of China, burned for a month
 1988Yellowstone fires of 1988 largest, most expensive wildfire in the history of the National Park Service, at the world's first national park.
 1991Oakland firestorm of 1991, Oakland, California, U.S., killed 25 people and injured 150 others.
 1994Isabela Island forest fire, Galápagos Island, Ecuador, 12 km² lost in April.
 1994South Canyon Fire on Storm King Mountain near Glenwood Springs, Colorado kills fourteen firefighters on July 6.
 2002Biscuit Fire, the largest wildfire in the recorded history of Oregon
 2003Canberra bushfires, Australian Capital Territory, 4 killed and 435 injured
 2003Cedar Fire, destroyed over 550 homes and many acres of land, Southern California
 20032003 Okanagan Mountain Park Fire, British Columbia
 2005Eyre Peninsula bushfire, South Australia, 9 killed, at least 113 injured and 79 houses destroyed
 2006Pilliga forest fire burned out 740 km² on just its first day
 2007October 2007 California wildfires
 2008Summer 2008 California wildfires, second costliest in US history to extinguish.
 2009Black Saturday bushfires In February, at the end of the early 2009 southeastern Australia heat wave, bushfires swept through the Australian state of Victoria killing 180 people, injuring around 500, destroying at least 2029 homes.
 20102010 Russian wildfires, 2000 buildings, 8000 km² destroyed, 54 killed.
 2010Mount Carmel forest fire in Israel led to 44 fatalities.
 2011Fires across parts of Northern Ireland and the Republic of Ireland, during the Easter holidays, destroying many parks and forests.
 2011Summer fire outbreak across Texas claimed almost 4 million acres in over 21,000 fires. Approximately 7,000 homes were lost and approximately 50,000 homes in direct danger were saved by fire departments across the state.
 2011Two wildfires burn in Bastrop, Texas; 2 people killed, 34,000 acres burned, over 1000 houses and other structures destroyed
 2011Swinley Forest, UK, 12 fire services attended from various counties to extinguish this forest fire in Berkshire.
 2015Sampson Flat bushfires, Mount Lofty Ranges, South Australia, destroyed 12,500 hectares (31,000 acres) of native forest, farmland, vineyards and 27 houses, with no human fatalities
 2016 A series of wildfires raged across mainland Portugal and the Portuguese archipelago of Madeira.
 2017 Between 30 and 40 gorse fires raged across the country [Ireland] between late April and early May.
 2017 A series of wildfires, burn across Pedrógão Grande and Nodeirinho in Portugal, killing at least 66 people and injuring at least 204 others.
 2017 Fires consumed hundreds of thousands of acres of Oregon's Deschutes National Forest, Columbia River Gorge National Scenic Area, and the Willamette National Forest during August and September, causing evacuations and road closures. Fires included the Chetco Bar Fire and the Eagle Creek Fire, which also spread into Skamania County, Washington, United States.
2018 Camp Fire in California. Began November 8, 2018; caused 85 deaths and destroyed 18,804 structures.
2018 Woolsey Fire in California, which broke out on the same day as the Camp Fire. Resulted in three deaths and the destruction of 1,643 structures, among them, the homes of notable celebrities.
2019 2019 Nelson fires – Two wildfires, 20 kilometres apart in Nelson and Tasman District, New Zealand, started on 5 February 2019. The Pigeon Valley fire was described as the country's largest since 1955 and New Zealand's largest aerial firefight on record with 22 helicopters involved.
2020Cagua fire – On 23 January 2020, a fire was started in the Agrícola del Lago reed bed in Cagua, Aragua state, Venezuela. Eleven people were confirmed to have died as a result of the fire, all but two being minors.

See also

List of fires by locations
 List of fires in Canada
 List of fires in China
 List of fires in Kyoto
 List of fires in Nigeria
 List of accidents and disasters by death toll
 List of the largest artificial non-nuclear explosions

References

Further reading
   Irish Examiner article on 1875 fire

fires